Stephen Kandel (born April 30, 1927) is an American television writer.  He graduated from Dartmouth College in 1950.

Filmography
He has written episodes for many popular series, from Sea Hunt in the 1950s through MacGyver in the 1980s, with stops in between at Star Trek: The Original Series, Mannix, Wonder Woman, The Six Million Dollar Man, Cannon, Barnaby Jones, Banacek, and others. He is credited with writing the pilot episodes of Daktari, Broken Promises, and Chamber of Horrors, and creating the series Iron Horse.

Films

Television

Awards

He is a recipient of the Mystery Writers of America Edgar Allan Poe award and the Writers Guild of America Humanities award. According to film commentator Tom Weaver, Kandel's "resume reads like a Baby Boomer's dream list of must-see TV".

Family

Kandel's father, Aben Kandel, was also a screenwriter. His younger sister, Lenore Kandel, was a Beat Generation poet and activist.

External links

References 

1927 births
Living people
American television writers
American male screenwriters
American male television writers
20th-century American screenwriters
20th-century American male writers
Dartmouth College alumni